Kirbyville is a village  in Taney County, Missouri, United States. The population was 195 at the 2020 census. It is part of the Branson, Missouri Micropolitan Statistical Area.

History
A post office called Kirbyville has been in operation since 1871. One Mr. Kirby, an early postmaster, gave the community his last name.

The Snap Balds where the Bald Knobbers were organized in 1883 are located just to the northwest of the village.

Kirbyville incorporated on June 4, 2001.

Geography
Kirbyville is located approximately seven miles east of Branson on Route 76 at the intersection of Route 76 and Missouri Route J. The farming and residential community is part of the Branson Micropolitan Statistical Area. Kirbyville's has the ZIP code 65679.

Demographics

2010 census
As of the census of 2010, there were 207 people, 77 households, and 54 families residing in the village. The racial makeup of the village was 88.4% White, 0.5% African American, 2.4% Asian, 7.2% from other races, and 1.4% from two or more races. Hispanic or Latino of any race were 6.8% of the population.

There were 77 households, of which 29.9% had children under the age of 18 living with them, 53.2% were married couples living together, 13.0% had a female householder with no husband present, 3.9% had a male householder with no wife present, and 29.9% were non-families. 27.3% of all households were made up of individuals, and 15.6% had someone living alone who was 65 years of age or older. The average household size was 2.69 and the average family size was 3.28.

The median age in the village was 38.8 years. 28.0% of residents were under the age of 18; 8.7% were between the ages of 18 and 24; 20.8% were from 25 to 44; 30.9% were from 45 to 64; and 11.6% were 65 years of age or older. The gender makeup of the village was 49.8% male and 50.2% female.

Education
Accessible educational options include Kirbyville Elementary (pre-school to 3rd grade) and Kirbyville Middle School (4th to 8th grade), Branson High School, Hollister High School, Forsyth High School, College of the Ozarks and Trinity Christian Academy.

References

Villages in Taney County, Missouri
Branson, Missouri micropolitan area
Villages in Missouri